Ross Deal is an American politician. He served as a Democratic member for the 7th district of the Indiana House of Representatives.

Deal served in the United States Marine Corps. In 2018, he won the election for the 7th district of the Indiana House of Representatives. Deal succeeded politician, Joe Taylor after Deal was arranged to serve office for the 7th district. In 2020, he succeeded politician, Jake Teshka. In 2022, Deal will appear in the general election for the 7th district, in which he was unopposed for the Democratic primary and was declared of the 2022 Indiana House of Representatives election. He will have the general election against Teshka.

References 

Living people
Place of birth missing (living people)
Year of birth missing (living people)
Democratic Party members of the Indiana House of Representatives
21st-century American politicians